2010 Quadrangular Twenty20 Series in Sri Lanka was a tournament of Twenty20 cricket matches that were held in Sri Lanka from 1 to 4 February 2010. The four participating teams were Afghanistan, Canada, Ireland and Sri Lanka A. The matches were played in Colombo.

Squads

Round Robin stage

Points Table

Matches

References

International cricket competitions in 2010
Twenty20 International cricket competitions
Sri Lankan cricket seasons from 2000–01